Gene Winston Walter (born November 22, 1960) is an American former professional baseball relief pitcher for the San Diego Padres (-), New York Mets (-), and Seattle Mariners (1988).

On July 18, 1988, Walter set a Mariners record and tied an American League record for most balks in a game with 4.

References

External links

1960 births
Living people
American expatriate baseball players in Canada
Appleton Foxes players
Baseball players from Chicago
Calgary Cannons players
Eastern Kentucky Colonels baseball players
Edmonton Trappers players
Louisville Redbirds players
Major League Baseball pitchers
New Britain Red Sox players
New York Mets players
Omaha Royals players
Pawtucket Red Sox players
San Diego Padres players
Seattle Mariners players
Syracuse Chiefs players
Tidewater Tides players
Tucson Toros players
Beaumont Golden Gators players
Las Vegas Stars (baseball) players
Walla Walla Padres players